The Canterbury Red Devils is an ice hockey team based in Christchurch, New Zealand and are members of the New Zealand Ice Hockey League. The club plays their home games at the Alpine Ice Centre. Since their foundation in 2005 the team have won both the regular season title and the playoffs on four occasions with their most recent coming in the 2014 NZIHL season.

History
The Canterbury Red Devils were founded in 2005 and joined the New Zealand Ice Hockey League (NZIHL) for its inaugural season. In their debut season the Red Devils finished the regular season in last place and failed to qualify for the playoffs. They again missed the playoffs in 2006 after finishing third in the standings. In 2007 the Red Devils won their first regular season title, edging out the Botany Swarm on goal difference. The team advanced to their first finals appearance however lost to the Swarm. The Red Devils won their second regular season title in 2008 however, went on to lose to the Swarm in the final. In 2009 the team won their third straight regular season title and advanced to the final against the Southern Stampede. The Red Devils defeated the Stampede to claim their first playoffs title. The 2010 and 2011 seasons saw the Red Devils finish the regular season in third place, losing out to the second placed team only on head-to-head win ratio. The team returned to the playoffs in 2012, winning their second playoffs title after defeating the Stampede in the final. The Red Devils went on to win the 2013 and 2014 playoffs, defeating the Dunedin Thunder in both finals and also claiming their fourth regular season title in 2014. Following their 2014 playoffs win the Red Devils became the first NZIHL club to claim three titles in a row. The 2015 season saw the Red Devils finish the regular season in second place and lose to the Stampede in the finals.

Season by season results

NZIHL Awards
NZIHL champions 2009, 2012, 2013, 2014
NZIHL Minor Premiership: 2007, 2008, 2009, 2014
Toa Kauhunga Riri Tio: New Zealand Ice Hockey League#Toa Kauhanga Riri Tio
NZIHL Finals MVP: Dale Harrop (2014), Takumi Ledbetter (2013), Valeri Konev (2012), Justin Findlay (2009)
Best Defencemen: Terry Watt (2013), Dan Nicholls (2011), Mitchell Oak (2010), Hayden Argyle (2007)
Top Points NZIHL: Chris Eaden (2009, 2010, 2011, 2012), Janos Kaszala (2007, 2008)
NZIHL Top Goaltender: Michael Coleman (2014), Justin Findlay (2009)
NZIHL Rookie of the year: Dale Harrop (2007), Dan Nicholls (2008), Ryan Ruddle (2009), Jerreau Hohaia (2011), Jake Ratcliffe (2013), Jacob Carey (2021)

Players and personnel

Current roster
Team roster for the 2021 NZIHL season

Team captains

Hayden Argyle, 2012–2015
James Archer, 2016
Chris Eaden, 2017

Head coaches
Jonathon Whitehead, 2010
János Kaszala, 2011
Anatoli Khorozov, 2012–2013
Stacey Rout, 2014
Anatoli Khorozov, 2015
Matthew Sandford, 2016 - 2017
Anatoli Khorozov, 2018

General managers
Jake Lane, 2012 - 2015
Martin Jeffreys, 2016
Sherry Peck, 2017
Jake Lane, 2018

References

External links
Canterbury Red Devils

2005 establishments in New Zealand
Ice hockey clubs established in 2005
Ice hockey teams in New Zealand
New Zealand Ice Hockey League teams
Sport in Christchurch